Back in the World of Adventures is the first studio album released by the Swedish progressive rock band The Flower Kings.

Track listing

Personnel
Roine Stolt - guitars, vocals, keyboards
Tomas Bodin - Hammond organ, Mellotron, synthesizers, piano, flute
Michael Stolt - bass
Jaime Salazar - drums (1-8)
Hasse Bruniusson - percussion, drums (10)

Guest
Ulf Wallander - soprano saxophone

Production
Produced by Roine Stolt and Don Azzaro
Recorded and engineered by Dexter Frank Jr.
Mixed by Tomas Bodin and Dexter Frank Jr.

References

External links
 

1995 albums
The Flower Kings albums